Butka may refer to:
Butka, Hungarian name of the village of Budkovce, Slovakia
Butka, Russia, a rural locality (a selo) in Sverdlovsk Oblast; birthplace of Boris Yeltsin